Aeneas Creek is a stream in the U.S. state of Montana. It is a tributary to Graves Creek.

Aeneas Creek was named after a Flathead chieftain.

Course
Aeneas Creek rises in Aeneas Lake in Flathead County, Montana, and then flows east-southeast to join Graves Creek about 0.5 miles west of Grave Bay Campground.

Watershed
Aeneas Creek drains  of area, receives about 64.3 in/year of precipitation, has a wetness index of 275.86, and is about 77% forested.

References

Rivers of Montana
Rivers of Flathead County, Montana